São Nicolau, meaning "Saint Nicholas" in Portuguese, may refer to the following places:

Brazil

São Nicolau (Rio Grande do Sul), a municipality of the state of Rio Grande do Sul
São Nicolau River, a river in the state of Piauí

Cape Verde

São Nicolau, Cape Verde, an island

Portugal

São Nicolau (Lisbon), a parish of the municipality of Lisbon
São Nicolau (Porto), a parish of the municipality of Porto
São Nicolau (Marco de Canaveses), a parish of the municipality of Marco de Canaveses
São Nicolau (Mesão Frio), a parish of the municipality of Mesão Frio
São Nicolau (Santarém), a parish of the municipality of Santarém.

See also
Saint Nicholas (disambiguation)